Karl Stoiber (13 October 1907 – 12 December 1994) was an Austrian football forward. He played six times for Austria, scoring two goals. Stoiber also played for FC Admira Wacker Mödling, Wiener AC, SK Donaufeld Wien and Floridsdorfer AC.

References

External links 
 

1907 births
1994 deaths
Footballers from Vienna
Austrian footballers
Austria international footballers
Association football forwards
FC Admira Wacker Mödling players
Wiener AC players
Floridsdorfer AC players